Piano Concerto in F may refer to:

 Concerto in F (Gershwin) by George Gershwin
 Piano Concerto No. 11 (Mozart) by Wolfgang Amadeus Mozart
 Piano Concerto No. 19 (Mozart) by Wolfgang Amadeus Mozart
 Piano Concerto No. 5 (Saint-Saëns), the Egyptian, by Camille Saint-Saëns
 Piano Concerto No. 2 (Shostakovich) by Dmitri Shostakovich

See also
Piano Concerto in F minor (disambiguation)